is the eighth live video album by Japanese band Wagakki Band, released on June 9, 2021 by Universal Music Japan in two editions: Blu-ray + DVD and a limited edition release with 60-page photo book. The video covers the band's two-day concert at the Nippon Budokan on January 3–4, 2021.

The video peaked at No. 2 on Oricon's Blu-ray chart.

Track listing
All tracks are arranged by Wagakki Band.

Personnel 
 Yuko Suzuhana – vocals
 Machiya – guitar, vocals ("Episode.0")
 Beni Ninagawa – tsugaru shamisen
 Kiyoshi Ibukuro – koto
 Asa – bass
 Daisuke Kaminaga – shakuhachi
 Wasabi – drums
 Kurona – wadaiko

Charts

References

External links 
 
  (Universal Music Japan)

Wagakki Band video albums
2021 live albums
Japanese-language live albums
Universal Music Japan video albums
Albums recorded at the Nippon Budokan